The First Lady of the Russian Federation is the unofficial title given to the wife of the president of Russia.
The post is highly ceremonial. The first lady position is currently vacant, since the divorce of the current president Vladimir Putin and Lyudmila Putina.

First ladies of Russia

References

Notes

See also 
First Lady
Russia
List of presidents of Russia

First Ladies of Russia
Russia
Spouses of Russian and Soviet national leaders
Government of Russia